William Prince may refer to:

William Prince (horticulturist) (1766–1842), New York City horticulturist
William Robert Prince (1795–1869), horticulturist
William Prince (actor) (1913–1996), American character actor
William Prince (cricketer) (1868–1948), English cricketer 
William Prince (musician) (born 1986), Canadian singer-songwriter
William Prince (politician) (1772–1824), U.S. Representative from Indiana
William Prince (1752–1810), namesake of Princeton, Kentucky
William J. Prince (1930–2012), General Superintendent of the Church of the Nazarene
William Stratton Prince (1824–1881), British Army officer and Chief Constable of Toronto
William Meade Prince (1893–1951), American magazine illustrator

See also 
Prince William (disambiguation)